Lost Paradise may refer to:

Film and television
The Lost Paradise (1914 film), an American silent film
The Lost Paradise (1917 film), a German silent film based on the Ludwig Fulda play (see below)
The Lost Paradise (1985 film), a Spanish film
Lost Paradise (film), a 1997 Japanese film based on the Junichi Watanabe novel (see below)
"Lost Paradise" (Raised by Wolves), a television episode

Literature
A Lost Paradise, a 1997 novel by Junichi Watanabe, adapted for a film and television series
Lost Paradise (novel), a 2004 novel by Cees Nooteboom
Lost Paradise (Marks book), a 2009 book about the 2004 Pitcairn Islands sexual assault trial, by Kathy Marks
The Lost Paradise, an 1892 play by Ludwig Fulda

Other media
Lost Paradise (album) or the title song, by Paradise Lost, 1990
Fist of the North Star: Lost Paradise, a 2018 video game based on the manga series Fist of the North Star

See also
Paradise Lost (disambiguation)